H2, H02, or H-2 may refer to:

Arts and media
 Armenia 2 (H2), a private television company broadcasting in Armenia and Nagorno-Karabakh
 H2 (A&E Networks), the rebranded name of the former channel History International
H2 (American TV channel), the American version of the channel
 H2 (manga), a baseball manga by Mitsuru Adachi
 Halo 2, a video game for the Xbox, created and developed by Bungie
 Halloween II (2009 film), initially abbreviated to H2
 Hollywood Squares, referred to as H2 informally during the 2002–2004 seasons

Computing
 , level 2 heading markup for HTML Web pages, see HTML element#heading
 H2 (DBMS), an open-source Java SQL database-management system
 DSC-H2, a 2006 Sony Cyber-shot H series camera
 HTTP/2, major revision of HTTP, often abbreviated in discussions as h2, and identifying itself to other servers as h2 in TLS negotiation or h2c in the HTTP Upgrade header
 LGA 1155 CPU socket, also known as Socket H2

Roads and transportation
 Interstate H-2, a highway in Hawaii, located on the island of Oahu
 London Buses route H2

Science and mathematics

Biology and medicine
 ATC code H02 Corticosteroids for systemic use, a subgroup of the Anatomical Therapeutic Chemical Classification System
 British NVC community H2, a heath community in the British National Vegetation Classification system
 Histamine H2 receptor
 Prostaglandin H2
 H-2, the Major histocompatibility complex of the mouse (equivalent of the Human Leukocyte Antigens)

Chemistry
 H2, the chemical formula for hydrogen gas (dihydrogen)
 Deuterium (Hydrogen-2, H-2, 2H), the isotope of hydrogen with one proton, one neutron, and one electron

Other uses in science and mathematics
 H II region, a region of interstellar atomic hydrogen that is ionized
 , one of the three laryngeals in the reconstructed Proto-Indo-European language
 The Hardy space H2

Vehicles

Air and space
 H-II, a family of Japanese liquid-fueled rockets
 H-IIA
 H-IIB
 H-II Transfer Vehicle, a Japan Aerospace Exploration Agency unmanned spacecraft
 H-2 MUPSOW, a precision-guided glide bomb manufactured by Pakistan
 Landgraf H-2, an American single-seat twin-rotor helicopter produced in 1944
 Standard H-2, a U.S. Army reconnaissance plane produced in 1916

Automobiles
 Haval H2, a Chinese subcompact SUV
 Hummer H2, an American full-size SUV

Motorcycles
 Kawasaki H2 Mach IV, 1970s two-stroke motorcycle
 Kawasaki Ninja H2, 2010s supercharged motorcycle

Rail
 LB&SCR H2 class, a British LB&SCR locomotive
 GNR Class H2, a class of British steam locomotives 
 LNER Class H2, a class of British steam locomotives 
 H02 locomotive (Germany), a high-pressure steam locomotive made in 1930 
 Saxon XII H2, a German steam locomotive produced in 1922
 PRR H2, a model within the American PRR locomotive classification
 H2, designation for METRORail Siemens S70 light rail vehicles

Sea
 HMAS Success (H02), a Royal Australian Navy Admiralty S-class destroyer completed in 1918
 HMS Exmouth (H02), a British Royal Navy E-class destroyer commissioned in 1934
 HMS H2, a British Royal Navy H class submarine commissioned in 1915
 USS H-2 (SS-29), a U.S. Navy H-class submarine commissioned in 1913

Other uses
 H-2 Air Base, a military air base in Iraq
 H2 (classification), a para-cycling classification
 H-2A Visa, a United States visa for temporary or seasonal agricultural work
 H2, the second half of the business year
 H2 lamp, a halogen vehicle headlamp no longer manufactured
 H2, a model of hurricane tie manufactured by Simpson Strong-Tie Co.
 Sky Airline (IATA code H2)
 Area H2, an Israeli-controlled area under the Hebron Protocol
H2 as the nickname for New Zealand civil servant Heather Simpson

See also
 HII (disambiguation)
 SH-2 Seasprite, an American helicopter
 Harrison Number Two, an 18th-century marine chronometer built by John Harrison